Jonathan Montague Wilkinson (18 July 1908 – 19 September 1979) was an English professional footballer who made over 220 appearances in the Football League for Charlton Athletic as a forward. He also played league football for Blackpool, Newcastle United and Everton.

Personal life 
Wilkinson served in the Royal Air Force during the Second World War and saw action in Burma. After retiring from football, he lived in Lincoln and later managed a cinema in Washington. In 2014, Wilkinson was the subject of an e-book, titled Dad's Story.

Honours 
Charlton Athletic

 Football League Second Division second-place promotion: 1935–36
 Football League Third Division South: 1934–35

Career statistics

References 

English Football League players
English footballers
Clapton Orient F.C. wartime guest players
Association football outside forwards
Association football forwards
Footballers from County Durham
1908 births
1979 deaths
Esh Winning F.C. players
Durham City A.F.C. players
Crook Town A.F.C. players
Newcastle United F.C. players
Everton F.C. players
Blackpool F.C. players
Charlton Athletic F.C. players
Royal Air Force personnel of World War II
People from Esh Winning